Willard Sylvester Jones was an American football coach.  He served as the head football coach at Delaware State University from 1951 to 1952, compiling a record of 3–14.  A native of Wilmington, Delaware, Jones attended Morgan State College—now known as Morgan State University—where he played football and basketball.

Head coaching record

References

Year of birth missing
Year of death missing
Guards (basketball)
Delaware State Hornets football coaches
Morgan State Bears football players
Morgan State Bears men's basketball players
Players of American football from Wilmington, Delaware
Basketball players from Wilmington, Delaware
African-American coaches of American football
African-American players of American football
African-American basketball players
20th-century African-American sportspeople